Bennett Run is a  tributary of Conewago Creek in York County, Pennsylvania in the United States.

The Kise Mill Bridge spans Bennett Run in Newberry Township.

See also
List of rivers of Pennsylvania

References

Rivers of Pennsylvania
Tributaries of the Susquehanna River
Rivers of York County, Pennsylvania